The Estrella Adobe Church, an adobe dwelling built in 1879, is a California Historical Landmark (#542). It fell into disuse and was in ruins when, according to the marker, the Paso Robles Women's Club History and Landmarks Committee restored the structure beginning in 1950 and completing in 1952.

On the property, there is an inactive cemetery with the earliest burials that appear to be 1878 and the latest burial is 1959. The Pleasant Valley Estrella Cemetery District operates and maintains the cemetery.

Landmark
Estrella Adobe Church was designated as a California Historical Landmark in 1981.

References

External links 
Lynne Landwehr (2004). History in San Luis Obispo, The (1879) Estrella Adobe Church

California Historical Landmarks
Buildings and structures in Paso Robles, California
History of San Luis Obispo County, California
Churches completed in 1879
Adobe buildings and structures in California
Churches in San Luis Obispo County, California
1879 establishments in California